Poranki is a Major Locality of Vijayawada in Krishna district of the Indian state of Andhra Pradesh. It is located in Penamaluru mandal of Vijayawada revenue division. As per the G.O. No. M.S.104 (dated:23-03-2017), Municipal Administration and Urban Development Department, it became a part of Vijayawada metropolitan area. 
It is 2 KM from Penamaluru.

Transport

Education 
The primary and secondary school education is imparted by government, aided and private schools, under the School Education Department of the state. The medium of instruction followed by different schools are English, Telugu.

See also 
List of census towns in Andhra Pradesh

References 

Neighbourhoods in Vijayawada